Bare As Bones is a compilation of previous material by American hardcore band Backstabbers Incorporated.    It was released along with Deadwater Drowning by Deadwater Drowning and Dulling Occams Razor by Found Dead Hanging as the inaugural releases of Black Market Activities on July 15, 2003.

Track listing

Personnel 

 Matt Serven - guitar, vocals
 Brian Serven - bass
 Jonah Livingston - drums

References

2003 albums
Backstabbers Incorporated albums
Black Market Activities albums